Halldis Moren Vesaas (18 November 1907 – 8 September 1995) was a Norwegian poet, translator and writer of children's books. She established herself as one of the leading Norwegian writers of her generation.

Biography

She was born on a family farm near Trysil in Hedmark county, Norway. Her father was story writer, poet, and playwright, Sven Moren. (1871–1938). She was the eldest and only girl in a family of five children. Her brothers included  philologist Sigmund Moren (1913–1996). She attended the teacher college in Elverum 1925-1928, and then held various jobs in Hamar and Oslo. In 1930 she moved to Switzerland, where she worked for three years as secretary. In April 1934, she married the Norwegian  author, Tarjei Vesaas (1897-1970). They settled on the Midtbø farm in Vinje in Telemark County  where her husband worked as a teacher (1941–43).

She debuted in 1929 at 22 years old with a collection of poetry, Harp and Dagger  (Harpe og dolk).   Her more notable books of poetry would include Speech of Troubled Times (Tung tids tale), The Tree (Treet), In a Different Forest (I ein annan skog) and House of Life (Livshus). She composed and translated for the theater, especially Det Norske Teatret in Oslo, wrote articles on various topics and was an external publishing consultant.  She sat on the board of the Riksteatret  (1949-1969). In 1938, her first children's book translation was published. Her writing won great acclaim in Norway for her brave and personal expressions of women's life in its several stages: youth, marriage, motherhood, widowhood and second love in old age.

Vesaas died on 8 September 1995.

Awards and honours
 She was awarded the Mads Wiel Nygaards Endowment in 1977. 
 She was appointed Commander of the Order of St. Olav in 1984. 
 She was a Knight of the National Order of Merit, France's second-highest order. 
 In 1992, she was awarded the Anders Jahre Cultural Prize  (Anders Jahres kulturpris) jointly with Benny Motzfeldt.
 The Halldis Moren Vesaas Prize is named in her honor.

Selected works

Poetry
 Harpe og dolk, 1929
 Morgonen, 1930
 Strender, 1933
 Lykkelege hender, 1936
 Tung tids tale, 1945
 Treet, 1947
 I ein annan skog, 1955
 Livshus, 1995

Children's books
 Du får gjera det du, 1935
 Den grøne hatten, 1938
 Hildegunn, 1942
 Tidleg på våren, 1949

References

Other sources
Garton, Janet ( 2002)  Norwegian Women's Writing 1850-1990. Women in Context (The Athlone Press)  

1907 births
1995 deaths
People from Trysil
Norwegian women poets
Norwegian children's writers
Nynorsk-language writers
Norwegian women children's writers
20th-century Norwegian poets
20th-century Norwegian women writers
20th-century Norwegian translators
Recipients of the St. Olav's Medal
Dobloug Prize winners
People from Vinje